On 3 March 2014, gunmen attacked District Courts Complex in Sector F-8 of Islamabad, Pakistan. Eleven people were killed and twenty-five people were injured as a result of the attack.

History
The assailants arrived at the courthouse around nine in the morning, carrying rifles and wearing suicide vests. The attackers first began throwing grenades at police officers who were at the scene. They then started shooting at people. When the police officers tried to attack back at the assailants, they blew themselves up.

It was originally not known who the attackers were, but later it was revealed that Ahrar-ul-Hind was the group behind the attack.

References

2014 murders in Pakistan
21st-century mass murder in Pakistan
2010s in Islamabad
Attacks in Pakistan in 2014
Terrorist incidents in Islamabad
March 2014 crimes in Asia
March 2014 events in Pakistan
Mass murder in 2014
Mass murder in Pakistan
Mass shootings in Pakistan
Suicide bombings in Pakistan
Terrorist incidents in Pakistan in 2014
Attacks on buildings and structures in Pakistan
2014 mass shootings in Asia
Building bombings in Pakistan
Mass murder in Islamabad